Dan Griffith (born September 29, 1987), known by his stage name Gryffin (often stylized in all caps), is an American musician, DJ, songwriter, and record producer. He gained recognition for remixing some well-known songs such as Tove Lo's "Talking Body", Maroon 5's "Animals" and Years & Years' "Desire".

Background 
Gryffin was born in San Francisco, California to an American father and a Japanese mother. Gryffin grew up as a classically trained pianist and learned to play the guitar at an early age. He played in bands to initially hone his instrumental abilities. He is a graduate of Saint Francis High School in Mountain View, California. He studied electrical engineering at the University of Southern California where he spent much of his leisure time in his dorm room to work on music. 

When asked on his key lessons of music production, he said: "At the beginning, I just released music with the main goal of having my friends play it at college parties and I never would have imagined it would get to this point". He made his 'world' debut as Gryffin at the SnowGlobe Music Festival 2015.

His stage name was inspired by both his surname "Griffith" and the mythical bird griffin.

Before beginning his solo career, Griffith was 1/2 of the mashup duo White Panda.

2016

On January 22, 2016, Gryffin released his debut single titled "Heading Home" featuring Australian singer Josef Salvat via Darkroom/Interscope Records. On May 2, 2016, an official music video was uploaded on his YouTube channel. The song peaked at number 22 on the Hot Dance/Electronic Songs chart, number 21 on the Dance/Electronic Digital Songs chart, number 1 on Spotify Viral 50 chart and number 5 on the Billboard Twitter Emerging Artists chart. On August 26, 2016, he released a song titled "Whole Heart" with Bipolar Sunshine. In an interview, about the song "Whole Heart", Gryffin said "'Whole Heart’ is a big step for me as an artist, as it represents a developing maturity of my sound and depth of songwriting".

2017
2017 saw three singles for Gryffin. "Feel Good", a collaboration with DJ Illenium and singer Daya, was released on March 3. "Love in Ruins" with singer Sinéad Harnett was released on July 7 and "Nobody Compares to You" with Katie Pearlman was released on October 6.

2018
2018 proved to be a big year for Gryffin, releasing five singles throughout the year. His first single of the year, "Winnebago" with Quinn XCII and Daniel Wilson was released on April 20. He followed this up with single "Just for a Moment" with Iselin, released June 22, and "Tie Me Down" with Elley Duhé, released on August 3. Two months following the release of "Tie Me Down", Gryffin released a song with Zohara. "Remember" was released on October 26 and eventually topped the US Dance Charts, marking Griffith's first number one hit song.

2019: Gravity
In 2019, Gryffin released his full-length debut album, Gravity, to critical acclaim.

2020
On July 26, 2020, Gryffin announced the release of "Cry", with John Martin, on his Instagram page. He hinted that the track would be the first single from his upcoming second album, and announced July 30, 2020 as the single's release date. On November 19, 2020, Gryffin released “Safe With Me” with Audrey Mika.

2021
Gryffin released "I Want Love" featuring Two Feet on Feb 10, 2021. He announced the release one day prior on his instagram page.

2022: Alive
On April 1, 2022, Gryffin released "You Were Loved" featuring OneRepublic.

On November 4, 2022, Gryffin released his 2nd album, Alive.

Personal life 
He moved to Los Angeles in 2016 to be closer to his label and management. He married his wife, Stephanie, in April 2018. He moved to Las Vegas, Nevada in January 2020 where he currently resides and plays at various nightclubs when he is not making an appearance out of state.

Musical style 
Gryffin produces music in a melodic house style and classifies himself as a melodic house artist. He incorporates sounds of piano and guitar for a 'hybrid of electric and organic' musical style.

Discography

Studio albums

Extended plays

Singles

Other charted songs

Notes

References 

1987 births
Living people
American DJs
American house musicians
American people of Japanese descent
American musicians of Japanese descent
Electronic musicians
Future bass musicians
Electronic dance music DJs
Tropical house musicians
University of Southern California alumni
21st-century American musicians
Interscope Records artists
Geffen Records artists